187 He Wrote is the second studio album by American rapper Spice 1. It was released on September 28, 1993, via Jive Records. It peaked at number 1 on the Top R&B/Hip-Hop Albums and at number 10 on the Billboard 200, and being certified gold by the RIAA.

Track listing

Charts

Weekly charts

Year-end charts

Singles

Certifications

See also
List of number-one albums of 1993 (U.S.)

References

External links 
 [ 187 He Wrote] at AllMusic
 187 He Wrote at Discogs
 187 He Wrote at MusicBrainz

1993 albums
Spice 1 albums
Jive Records albums
Albums produced by E-A-Ski
Albums produced by Prodeje
Albums produced by Ant Banks
Albums produced by Too Short